Clathurellidae  is a monophyletic family of small to medium-sized sea snails, marine gastropod mollusks in the superfamily Conoidea.

Taxonomy

2005 taxonomy 
In the taxonomy of the Gastropoda by Bouchet & Rocroi (2005) Clathurellinae was classified as a subfamily of Conidae.

2011 taxonomy 
In 2011 Bouchet, Kantor et al. brought some genera from the subfamily Clathurellinae (at that point belonging to the family Conidae) in a new family, Clathurellidae. This was based on anatomical characters and a dataset of molecular sequences of three gene fragments.

Description
Species in this family have small to medium-sized fusiform shells that have strong sculpture. The apex is mammillary. The anal sinus is varicose, and touches the sutural ramp. The columella is tuberculated posterior, rugose in front. It lacks columellar pleats. The siphonal canal is slightly curved, and varies in length between short to moderately long (as in Glyphostoma rostrata). The operculum is always absent in this family.

The family Clathurellidae appears to differ from the family Mangeliidae principally in its more rounded whorls and cancellate sculpture.

Genera
Genera within the family Clathurellidae include:
 Acrista Hedley, 1922
 Adanaclava Bartsch, 1950
 Clathurella Carpenter, 1857
 Comarmondia Monterosato, 1884 - synonyms: Bellardia Bucquoy, Dautzenberg & Dollfus, 1883; Bellardiella P. Fischer, 1883; Bellatula Strand, 1929
 Corinnaeturris Bouchet & Warén, 1980
 Crockerella Hertlein & Strong, 1951
 Etrema Hedley, 1918 - synonym: Iraqetrema Dance & Eames, 1966
 Etremopa Oyama, 1953
 Etremopsis Powell, 1942
 Euclathurella Woodring, 1928
 Euglyphostoma Woodring, 1970
 Glyphostoma Gabb, 1873
 Glyphostomops Bartsch, 1934
 Lienardia Jousseaume, 1884
 Nannodiella Dall, 1919
 Paraclathurella Boettger, 1895
 Pleurotomoides Bronn, 1831
 Pseudoetrema Oyama, 1953
 Strombinoturris Hertlein & Strong, 1951
 Turrella Laseron, 1954
Genera brought into synonymy
 Bellardia Bucquoy, Dautzenberg & Dollfus, 1883: synonym of Comarmondia Monterosato, 1884
 Bellardiella P. Fischer, 1883: synonym of Comarmondia Monterosato, 1884
 Bellatula Strand, 1929: synonym of Comarmondia Monterosato, 1884
 Clathromangilia: synonym of Clathromangelia Monterosato, 1884
 Iraqetrema Dance & Eames, 1966: synonym of Etrema Hedley, 1918

References

External links 

 H. S. Ladd. 1982. Cenozoic fossil mollusks from Western Pacific Islands; Gastropods (Volutidae through Terebridae). United States Geological Survey Professional Paper 1171:1-100